Pål Golberg (born 16 July 1990) is a Norwegian cross-country skier. His biggest World Cup success so far is the victory in FIS Ski Tour 2020, stage event placed in Sweden and Norway. He represents the club Gol IL.

Cross-country skiing results
All results are sourced from the International Ski Federation (FIS).

Olympic Games
 1 medal – (1 silver)

Distance reduced to 30 km due to weather conditions.

World Championships
5 medals – (4 gold, 1 silver)

World Cup

Season standings

Individual podiums
 10 victories – (8 , 2 )
 33 podiums – (22 , 11 )

Team podiums
2 victories – (2 ) 
9 podiums – (5 , 4 )

References

External links
 
 

1990 births
Living people
People from Gol, Norway
Norwegian male cross-country skiers
Tour de Ski skiers
Olympic cross-country skiers of Norway
Cross-country skiers at the 2014 Winter Olympics
Cross-country skiers at the 2018 Winter Olympics
Cross-country skiers at the 2022 Winter Olympics
Medalists at the 2022 Winter Olympics
Olympic silver medalists for Norway
Olympic medalists in cross-country skiing
FIS Nordic World Ski Championships medalists in cross-country skiing
Sportspeople from Viken (county)